Mohammad Ayub may refer to:

Mohammad Ayub Khan (1907–1974), Pakistani general and president
Mohammad Ayub (cricketer, born 1965), Indian cricketer
Mohammad Ayub (Bagram captive 2006, son of Mohammad Usman), listed on a habeas petition, see List of Bagram captives
Mohammed Ayub (born 1984), a Uyghur, formerly held in the Guantanamo Bay detention camps, in Cuba
Mohammed Ayub (Bagram captive 2006, son of Kareem Khan), listed on a habeas petition, see List of Bagram captives
Mohammad Ayub (Pakistani cricketer) (born 1979), Pakistani cricketer
Master Ayub, Pakistani teacher who runs an open air, free of cost, school in Islamabad since 1986